Langton Douglas Fox (21 February 1917 – 26 July 1997) was a Roman Catholic prelate who served as Bishop of Menevia from 1972 to 1981.

Born in Golders Green, London on 21 February 1917, he was ordained to the priesthood on 30 May 1942. In 1945 he was awarded the degree of Doctor of Divinity from Maynooth College (the first English born priest to receive a doctorate from the Irish National seminary). He was appointed an auxiliary bishop of Menevia and Titular Bishop of Maura on 18 October 1965. His consecration to the Episcopate took place on 16 December 1965, the principal consecrator was Bishop John Edward Petit of Menevia, and the principal co-consecrators were Archbishop Cyril Conrad Cowderoy of Southwark and Bishop Thomas Holland of Salford. He was appointed the Diocesan Bishop of Menevia on 16 June 1972. He participated in the fourth, and last, session of the Second Vatican Council, held between 14 September and 8 December 1965.

He resigned on 5 February 1981 and assumed the title Bishop Emeritus of Menevia. He died at Nazareth House in Wrexham on 26 July 1997, aged 80, and was buried in Wrexham Cemetery in Ruabon Road.

References

1917 births
1997 deaths
20th-century Roman Catholic bishops in Wales
Participants in the Second Vatican Council
People from Golders Green
Roman Catholic bishops of Menevia
Alumni of St Patrick's College, Maynooth
English bishops